Hester Pitt, Countess of Chatham (8 November 1720 – 9 April 1803) was the wife of William Pitt the Elder, 1st Earl of Chatham, who was prime minister of Great Britain from 1766 to 1768.

The sister of George Grenville, who was prime minister from 1763 to 1765, she was also the mother of Prime Minister William Pitt the Younger and a niece of the noted Whig politician Richard Temple, 1st Viscount Cobham, who had served as her husband's mentor.

Chatham and Elizabeth Grenville, her sister-in-law, are the only two women in British history to have been both the wife of a prime minister and the mother of another prime minister.

Early life
Born on 8 November 1720 in London, she was the only daughter of Richard Grenville and Hester Grenville, 1st Countess Temple.

Marriage
At 34, Lady Hester married Whig politician William Pitt on 16 November 1754 at her home in Argyle Street, London, by Francis Ayscough under special licence. They had five children:

 Lady Hester Pitt (19 October 175520 July 1780), who married Viscount Mahon, later the 3rd Earl Stanhope, on 19 December 1774; three children, including the traveler and Arabist Lady Hester Stanhope.
 John Pitt, 2nd Earl of Chatham (9 October 1756 – 24 September 1835), who married The Hon. Mary Townshend; no issue.
 Lady Harriet Pitt (18 April 1758 – 1786), who married The Hon. Edward James Eliot, oldest son of the 1st Baron Eliot, in 1785; one child.
Hon. William Pitt the Younger (28 May 1759 – 23 January 1806), who also served as prime minister; never married.
Hon. James Charles Pitt (176113 November 1780), Royal Navy officer and died in Antigua; never married.

On 4 December 1761, she was created "Baroness Chatham", of Chatham, in the County of Kent", with remainder to her sons by William Pitt. Her husband was created Earl of Chatham in 1766.

References

Sources

External links

Barons in the Peerage of Great Britain
British countesses
Burials at Westminster Abbey
Daughters of British earls
Hester
Hereditary peeresses of Great Britain created by George III
Spouses of prime ministers of the United Kingdom
1720 births
1803 deaths
Hester
Parents of prime ministers of the United Kingdom